Maksim Yuryevich Shvetsov (born 5 January 1973) is a Russian football coach and a former player.

References

1973 births
People from Orsk
Living people
Soviet footballers
Association football midfielders
FC SKA-Khabarovsk players
Russian footballers
FC Zhemchuzhina Sochi players
Russian Premier League players
Russian football managers
FC Chita players
Sportspeople from Orenburg Oblast